Macrocheilus moraisi is a species of ground beetle in the subfamily Anthiinae. It was described by A. Serrano in 2000.

References

Anthiinae (beetle)
Beetles described in 2000